Dalvirus is a genus of viruses in the realm Ribozyviria, containing the single species Dalvirus anatis.

Hosts 
The grey teal (Anas gracilis), chestnut teal (A. castanea), and Pacific black duck (A. superciliosa) serve as its hosts.

References 

Virus genera